"Sad Day" (stylised in all lowercase) is a song by English singer FKA Twigs. Released on 9 November 2019 by Young Turks, it serves as the fourth and final single from Twigs' second studio album, Magdalene. The song was written and produced by Twigs, Koreless, Benny Blanco, Cashmere Cat, Nicolas Jaar, Skrillex and Noah Goldstein.

Composition 
"Sad Day" is a slow art pop track with elements from electronic, pop, R&B, and industrial music. The lyrics of the song are about Twigs calling for her lover as he moves further away. Stacey Anderson of Pitchfork wrote that, on the song, "twigs’ eyes are open and her heart is tired." Rolling Stone's Jon Blistein wrote that the song "finds Twigs caught in the throes of unrequited love, deep passion and heartbreak." Musically, Twigs' vocals on the song are distorted, and the production was described as "shift[ing] between an atmospheric synthscape and industrial stomp," with digital effects that "suggest insistent rain, and a sly, scratchy bass drop [that] pierces the optimistic haze." Charlotte Krol of NME called it an "enciting," and "jittering, intimate track." In an interview with Beats 1, Twigs revealed that she considers the bridge on "Sad Day" to be the most emotional part of Magdalene for her.

Music video 
The accompanying music video for "Sad Day" was released on August 28, 2020. The video, which is more than 6 minutes long, was called a short film and was directed by Hiro Murai. In a press statement, Twigs revealed that the video was the culmination of all of her training and dancing, and that she had undergone three years of Wushu training. The video for "Sad Day" was partially inspired by a lyric from another Magdalene single, "Home with You", in which Twigs sings, "never seen a hero like me in a sci-fi."

Synopsis 
In a Pitchfork cover story, Twigs described the concept for the video as that of a "couple whose emotional conflict is represented by a spectacular wushu duel." The video sees Twigs duelling Teake, a dancer Twigs cast over social media, in swordfight around London. At the end of the video, Teake cuts Twigs in half in an apartment, but instead of flesh and blood, Murai stated that they wanted Twigs' insides to look "ethereal and otherworldly," resulting in something pink that bubbles and blooms inside Twigs' body.

Reception 
The music video was well received. Twigs found praise for her swordsmanship and mastery of Wushu. Tom Breihan of Stereogum wrote, "FKA twigs has always made incredible music videos, and "sad day" ranks right up there with her best." Gregory Lawrence of Collider called the music video "surreal, inventive, and [a] psychologically exacting look at love, obsession, and ennui." and compared it to the works of David Lynch. In reference to the ending of the music video, Emily Lordi, writing for T: The New York Times Style Magazine, said, "the turn to the fantastic is signature Twigs."

Critical reception
Pitchfork gave "Sad Day" "Best New Track" and they described Twigs's vocal as "her own defiance and anger, before she slips effortlessly back into airy entreaties".

Year-end lists

Personnel
 FKA Twigs – vocals
 Koreless – synths, synth strings
 Nicolas Jaar – synths, drums
 Benny Blanco – synths, drums
 Noah Goldstein – drums, engineering
 Hudson Mohawke – drums
 Skrillex – drums
 Manny Marroquin – mixing

Charts

References

2019 singles
2019 songs
FKA Twigs songs
Songs written by Benny Blanco
Songs written by Cashmere Cat
Songs written by Nicolas Jaar
Songs written by Skrillex
Song recordings produced by Skrillex
Song recordings produced by Benny Blanco